Bow Road is a London Underground station located on Bow Road in Bow, London, England. It is on the District and Hammersmith & City lines. The two stations are classed as a single station for ticketing purposes as well as on tube maps but both managed separately.

Location
The station is situated on the road that reflects its own name, while a fire exit leads to Wellington Way. National rail c2c tracks and Mornington Grove road cross above the District line to the east of the platforms. Nearby landmarks include the Minnie Lansbury Memorial, Phoenix Primary and Secondary School, Thames Magistrates' Court, Bow Road police station and Tower Hamlets Cemetery Park. The station serves a medium-sized population, as part of its catchment overlaps Mile End station.

History
The station was opened on 11 June 1902 by the Whitechapel and Bow Railway (which was later incorporated into the District line), with the Hammersmith & City line (then the Metropolitan line) following in 1936.

The Great Eastern Railway Bow Road railway station, which closed in 1949, stood on the opposite of Bow Road.

Ownership of the station passed to London Underground in 1950.

Design and layout

The station building is Grade II listed since 27 September 1973. Red bricks form the exterior facade, featuring stone eaves cornice and brick blocking course. The structure is topped with a slate roof, and has round arched doors. The doors are finished with fanlights, with four windows arranged alternately. An enclosed footbridge hangs across the platforms sheltered with canopies, both of which are made of wood. The canopies are barrel-vaulted, supported by cast iron beams and wall brackets, and hexagonal cast iron pillars. The pillars are arranged in line, following the curvature of the platforms. There are 12 pillars on one platform, while the other has 14.

Bow Road station has two platforms, and marks the point where westbound trains from Upminster and Barking enter a tunnel; the gradient of the tunnel approach, which is to the east of the station, is 1 in 28, the steepest on the tube network. The station platforms are below street level, where the western end of the platforms is in tunnel while the eastern end is in an open cutting. Other stations on the District Line are designed in a similar way, such as High Street Kensington and Sloane Square.

Services and connections

Bow Road is served by both the District and Hammersmith & City lines, between Mile End and Bromley-by-Bow stations, in Travelcard Zone 2. Off-peak services on the District line generally run between Richmond or Ealing Broadway to Upminster. During peak hours, trains also operate to Wimbledon. The typical off-peak services, in trains per hour (tph) are:
District line:
12 tph eastbound to Upminster
6 tph westbound to Richmond
6 tph westbound Ealing Broadway
Hammersmith & City line:
6 tph eastbound to Barking
6 tph westbound to Hammersmith

London Buses services routes 25 and 205, local route 425, and night route N205 serve the station.

Bow Road is connected east via thoroughfare of the same name to Bow Church station on the Docklands Light Railway (DLR) as an out of station interchange (OSI); classed as a single station for ticketing purposes but are managed as separate stations.

References

External links

Hammersmith & City line stations
District line stations
Grade II listed buildings in the London Borough of Tower Hamlets
Grade II listed railway stations
Tube stations in the London Borough of Tower Hamlets
Former Whitechapel and Bow Railway stations
Railway stations in Great Britain opened in 1902
Bow, London